The Saint Lucia national netball team represent Saint Lucia in international netball. Saint Lucia are ranked 20th in the INF World Rankings, making them the fifth-highest-ranked team in the Americas netball region. Despite this position, the Saint Lucia team have not attended a major world tournament since the 2003 World Netball Championships in Jamaica, where they finished 15th. This changed in 2014 as they participated in the 2014 Commonwealth Games, finishing 12th.

Players
Saint Lucia's 2014 Commonwealth Games squad

 Shem Maxwell (captain)
 Zalika Paul (vice-captain)
 Ianna Hippolyte
 Denise Charles
 Chattany Justin
 Germaine Altifois-Fenelon
 Indira Laurencin-Roachford
 Roxanne Snyder
 Rommela Hunte
 Delia Samuel
 Judie Mathurin
 Saphia William

See also
 Sport in Saint Lucia
 Netball in the Americas

References

National netball teams of the Americas
Netball in Saint Lucia
N